Miss Namibia is an annual national beauty pageant in Namibia. It selects Namibian representatives to compete in three of the Big Four international beauty pageants, Miss World, Miss Universe and Miss Earth.

History
The first Miss Namibia was held in 1980 by Nic Kruger, the founder of the pageant. After that there are three national directors: Nic Kruger (1980–1996), Danie Botes (1997–1998) and Conny Maritz (1999–today).

According to the source from Glynis Fester (Miss RSA 1977)—the first Miss SWA-Namibia was Ann Parker who was crowned by her on 18 June 1977. This is on public record in the Rapport published on 19 June 1977. She did not go to any international pageants.

The first Miss Namibia was organised by the Afrikaans newspaper Die Republikein  in 1980 and conducted by Nic Kruger, the founding director of the pageant. The winner Desèré Kotze was allowed to participate in the Miss Universe contest representing Namibia, but wore the South African flag. After that there are two further national directors: Nic Kruger (1980–1996), Danie Botes (1997–1998) and Conny Maritz (1999–today).

International crowns

 One – Miss Universe winner: 
Michelle McLean (1992)

Titles

Note that the year designates the time Miss Namibia has acquired that particular pageant franchise.

Current
 Miss Universe (1981–present)
 Miss World (1989–present)
 Miss Earth (2022–present)

Titleholders

Titleholders under Miss Namibia org.

Miss Universe Namibia

The winner of Miss Namibia represents her country at the Miss Universe. On occasion, when the winner does not qualify (due to age) for either contest, a runner-up is sent.

Miss World Namibia

The winner of Miss Namibia represents her country at the Miss World. Since 2016 Miss Namibia is no longer sending a delegate to Miss World competition. In 2021 Miss Namibia planned to be returned at Miss World. A runner-up or winner is allowed to compete internationally.

Miss Earth Namibia

Notes

References

External links
Miss Namibia official site

 
Namibia
Namibia
Namibia
Recurring events established in 1980
1980 establishments in South West Africa
Namibian awards